A chandelier (also known as  girandole, candelabra lamp, or least commonly  suspended lights) is a branched ornamental light fixture designed to be mounted on ceilings or walls. Chandeliers are often ornate, and normally use incandescent light bulbs, though some modern designs also use fluorescent lamps and recently LEDs.

Classic chandeliers have arrays of hanging crystal prisms to illuminate a room with refracted light, while contemporary chandeliers assume a more minimalist design that does not contain prisms and illuminate a room with direct light from the lamps, sometimes also equipped with translucent glass covering each lamp. Modern chandeliers have a more modernized design that uses LEDs, and combines the elements of both classic and contemporary designs; some are also equipped with refractive crystal prisms or small mirrors.

Chandeliers are distinct from pendant lights, as they usually consist of multiple lamps and hang in branched frames, whereas pendant lights hang from a single cord and only contain one or two lamps with fewer decorative elements. Due to their size, they are often installed in hallways, living rooms, staircases, lounges, and dining rooms. However, miniature chandeliers also exist, which can be installed in smaller spaces such as bedrooms or small living spaces. The most typical places for larger chandeliers are churches or cathedrals.

Chandeliers evolved from candelabra and were invented during the medieval period. They originally used candles as their source of light, which remained in use until the 18th century, when gas lights, later superseded by electric lights, were invented.

Etymology
The word chandelier was first known in the English language in the 1736, borrowed from the Modern French word  meaning candle, which comes from the Latin .

History

Chandeliers holding oil lamps were used in the Byzantine period, known as polycandela (singular polycandelon). A later variation of the polycandelon took the shape of a lamp stand, placed on legs rather than hung by chains, some being known from the Seljuq realm and functioning as a prototype for the European chandelier, such as this example from the 12th-13th century. A development of late antiquity and further evolving during the early Middle Ages, polycandela were used in places such as churches, synagogues, and aristocratic households and took the shape of a bronze or iron frame holding a varying number of globular or conical glass beakers provided with a wick and filled with oil.

The earliest candle chandeliers were used by the wealthy in medieval times; this type of chandelier could be moved to different rooms. From the 15th century, more complex forms of chandeliers, based on ring or crown designs, became popular decorative features in palaces and homes of nobility, clergy and merchants. Their high cost made chandeliers symbols of luxury and status. Ivory chandeliers in the palace of the king of Mutapa, were depicted in a 17th century description by Olfert Dapper.

By the early 18th century, ornate cast ormolu forms with long, curved arms and many candles were in the homes of many in the growing merchant class. Neoclassical motifs became an increasingly common element, mostly in cast metals but also in carved and gilded wood. Chandeliers made in this style also drew heavily on the aesthetic of ancient Greece and Rome, incorporating clean lines, classical proportions and mythological creatures. Developments in glassmaking later allowed cheaper production of lead crystal, the light scattering properties of which quickly made it a popular addition to the form, leading to the cut glass chandelier, which was dominant from about 1750 until at least 1900.

During the 18th century, glass chandeliers were produced by Bohemians and Venetian glassmakers who were both masters in the art of making chandeliers. Bohemian style was largely successful across Europe and its biggest draw was the chance to obtain spectacular light refraction due to facets and bevels of crystal prisms.

As a reaction to this new taste, Italian glass factories in Murano created new kinds of artistic light sources. Since Murano glass was not suitable for faceting, typical work realized at the time in other countries where crystal was used, Venetian glassmakers relied upon the unique qualities of their glass. Typical features of a Murano chandelier are the intricate arabesques of leaves, flowers and fruits that would be enriched by coloured glass, made possible by the specific type of glass used in Murano. The soda glass (famed for its clarity) that they worked with was unique and contrasted with other types of glass produced in the world at that time. Great skill and time was required to twist and shape a chandelier precisely.

This new type of chandelier was called ciocca (literally "bouquet of flowers"), for the characteristic decorations of glazed polychrome flowers. The most sumptuous consisted of a metal frame covered with small elements in blown glass, transparent or colored, with decorations of flowers, fruits and leaves, while simpler models had arms made with unique pieces of glass. Their shape was inspired by an original architectural concept: the space on the inside is left almost empty, since decorations are spread all around the central support, distanced from it by the length of the arms. One of the common uses of the huge Murano chandeliers was the interior lighting of theatres and rooms in important palaces.

In the mid-19th century, as gas lighting caught on, branched ceiling fixtures called gasoliers (a portmanteau of gas and chandelier) were produced, and many candle chandeliers were converted. By the 1890s, with the appearance of electric light, some chandeliers used both gas and electricity. As distribution of electricity widened, and supplies became dependable, electric-only chandeliers became standard.  Another portmanteau word, electrolier, was coined for these, but nowadays they are most commonly called chandeliers.  Some are fitted with bulbs shaped to imitate candle flames, for example those shown below in Epsom and Chatsworth, or with bulbs containing a shimmering gas discharge.

The world's largest English chandelier (by Hancock Rixon & Dunt and probably F. & C. Osler) is in the Dolmabahçe Palace in Istanbul. It has 750 lamps and weighs 4.5 tons. Dolmabahçe has the largest collection of British and Baccarat crystal chandeliers in the world, and one of the great staircases has balusters of Baccarat crystal.

More complex and elaborate chandeliers continued to be developed throughout the 18th and 19th centuries, but the widespread introduction of gas and electricity had devalued the chandelier's appeal as a status symbol.

Toward the end of the 20th century, chandeliers were often used as decorative focal points for rooms, and often did not illuminate.

Glossary of terms

 Adam style  A Neoclassical style, light, airy and elegant chandelier – usually English.
 Arm  The light-bearing part of a chandelier also sometimes known as a branch.
 Arm plate  The metal or wooden block placed on the stem, into which the arms slot.
 Bag  A bag of crystal drops formed by strings hanging from a circular frame and looped back into the center underneath, associated especially with early American crystal and Regency style crystal chandeliers.
 Baluster  A turned wood or moulded stem forming the axis of a chandelier, with alternating narrow and bulbous parts of varying widths.
 Bead  A glass drop with a hole drilled right through.
 Bobèche  A dish fitted just below the candle nozzle, designed to catch drips of wax. Also known as a drip pan.
 Branch  Another name for the light-bearing part of a chandelier, also known as an arm. 
 Candelabrum  Not to be confused with chandeliers, candelabra are candlesticks, usually branched, designed to stand on tables, or if large, the floor.
 Candlebeam  A cross made from two wooden beams with one or more cups and prickets at each end for securing candles.
 Candle nozzle  The small cup into which the end of the candle is slotted. 
 Canopy  An inverted shallow dish at the top of a chandelier from which festoons of beads are often suspended, lending a flourish to the top of the fitting.
 Cage  An arrangement where the central stem supporting arms and decorations is replaced by a metal structure leaving the centre clear for candles and further embellishments.
 Corona  Another term for crown-style chandelier. 
 Crown  A circular chandelier reminiscent of a crown, usually of gilded metal or brass, and often with upstanding decorative elements.
 Crystal  Essentially a traditional marketing term for lead glass with a chemical content that gives it special qualities of clarity, resonance and softness, making it especially suitable for use in cut glass.  Some chandeliers, as at the Palace of Versailles are actually made of cut rock crystal (clear quartz), which cut glass essentially imitates.
 Drip pan  The dish fitted just below the candle nozzle, designed to catch drips of wax. Know also as a bobèche.
 Drop  A small piece of glass usually cut into one of many shapes and drilled at one end so that it can be hung from the chandelier as a pendant with a brass pin. A chain drop is drilled at both ends so that a series can be hung together to form a necklace or festoon.
 Dutch  Also known as Flemish, a style of brass chandelier with a bulbous baluster and arms curving down around a low hung ball. 
 Festoon  An arrangement of glass drops or beads draped and hung across or down a glass chandelier, or sometimes a piece of solid glass shaped into a swag. Also known as a garland.
 Finial  The final flourish at the very bottom of the stem. Some Venetian glass chandeliers have little finials hanging from glass rings on the arms.
 Hoop  A circular metal support for arms, usually on a regency-styles or other chandelier with glass pieces. Also known as a ring. 
 Montgolfière chandelier  Chandelier with a rounded bottom, like an inverted hot air balloon, named after the Montgolfier brothers, the early French balloonists. 
 Moulded  The process by which a pressed glass piece is shaped by being blown into a mould. 
 Neoclassical style chandelier Glass chandelier featuring many delicate arms, spires and strings of ovals rhomboids or octagons.
 Panikadilo  Gothic candelabrum chandelier hung from centres of Greek Orthodox cathedrals' domes.
 Prism A straight, many-sided drop. 
 Regency style chandelier A larger chandelier with a multitude of drops. Above a hoop, rises strings of beads that diminish in size and attach at the top to form a canopy. A bag, with concentric rings of pointed glass, forms a waterfall beneath. The stem is usually completely hidden.
 Soda glass  A type of glass used typically in Venetian glass chandeliers. Soda glass remains "plastic" for longer when heated, and can therefore be shaped into elegant curving leaves and flowers. Refracts light poorly and is normally fire polished.
 Spire  A tall spike of glass, round in section or flat sided. To which arms and decorative elements may be attached, made from wood, metal or glass.
 Tent  A tent shaped structure on the upper part of a glass chandelier where necklaces of drops attach at the top to a canopy and at the bottom to a larger ring.
 Venetian  A glass from the island of Murano, Venice but usually used to describe any chandelier in Venetian style.
 Waterfall or wedding cake  Concentric rings of icicle drops suspended beneath the hoop or plate.

See also
 Candelabra
 Ceiling rose
 Girandole
 J. & L. Lobmeyr, the first company to make an electric chandelier
 Light fixture
 Sconce
 Wheel chandelier

References

Sources
 Abbott James A., and Elaine M. Rice. Designing Camelot: The Kennedy White House Restoration. Van Nostrand Reinhold: 1998. .
 Katz, Cheryl and Jeffrey. Chandeliers. Rockport Publishers: 2001. .
 McCaffety, Kerri. The Chandelier Through the Centuries. Vissi d'Arte Books: 2007. .
 Parissien, Steven. Regency Style. Phaidon: 1992. .

Light fixtures
Glass art
Ceilings
Chandeliers

External links

Chandelier Types